Darcy's Wild Life is a teen sitcom starring Sara Paxton, and broadcast on Discovery Kids in the United States, and the Family Channel in Canada, from October 2004 to March 2006. The show also aired on NBC as part of the Discovery Kids on NBC programing block.

Premise
The series revolved around Darcy Fields, the daughter of an eccentric actress Victoria Fields who decides to move away from Malibu to raise her daughter in a more normal environment. Darcy is slow to adjust to her new home in the country. She gets a job at a local veterinary clinic called Creature Comforts. The show is mostly about the humorous situations Darcy gets into while adjusting to her new surroundings.

The series title is a pun on the word "wildlife", which is the main theme of the show. The title refers to Darcy's eccentric life dealing with wildlife. Many episodes also had titles based on puns, such as "Puppy Love" (with puppies), "Swine Flew the Coop" (on swine flu), "Knockin' on Heaven's Doggie Door" (song "Knockin' on Heaven's Door") or "The Trouble with Truffles" (Star Treks "Tribbles").

Cast and characters

Main 
 Sara Paxton as Darcy Fields: Darcy loves fashion and doesn't know too much about nature and is terrified of animals until she moves to what she calls "the middle of nowhere". She was born in a parking lot of her mother's movie premiere. She is always trying new things in this small little town. Darcy is also very girly at times and her favorite color is pink. 
 Natalie Radford as Victoria Fields: Before she had Darcy, Victoria was a famous actress. She owns a farm house where she and Darcy live.
 Andrew Chalmers as Jack Adams: Jack is Lindsay's little brother. He craves fame, and is always trying to do something either to get money or fame.
 Kerry Michael Saxena as Eli: Eli is a sweet, clumsy boy, whom Lindsay likes. He works for Victoria and knows a lot about animals. He is always getting himself into some sticky situation.
 Shannon Collis as Lindsay Adams: She is one of Darcy's best friends, and is often the voice of reason for Darcy. Lindsay is a hard-working girl that works in her dad's vet/pet shop. She is the big sister of Jack. She has a crush on Eli, and sometimes is in a conflict with Darcy ("Nature vs. Nurture"). She dated Tyler in the episode,"My Fair Lindsay". Lindsay's a straight-A student. Her dream is to be a Marine Vet. Lindsay and Jack's mom died when they were little.
 Kevin Symons as Dr. Kevin Adams: Kevin is the vet at Creature Comforts. He is quite eccentric, but a kind and competent veterinarian and like a dad to Darcy. He often tells disturbing stories, particularly about bad incidents with gourmet food, which can annoy Darcy.
 Melanie Leishman as Kathi Giraldi: Another one of Darcy's best friends. She is naive and doesn't always stand up for herself. She is bubbly and often rambles on about random subjects.

Recurring 
 Daniel Karasik as Layne Haznoy
 Ashley Leggat as Brittany MacMillan
 Demetrius Joyette as Colt Brewster
 Stephanie Chantel Durelli as Kristen Doves
 Kayla Perlmutter as Chloe McKenna

Episodes

Season 1 (2004–05)

Season 2 (2005–06)

Production 

The series was filmed in Toronto, Canada, and many of the show's cast were Canadian. It was executive produced by Stan Rogow.

Awards and nominations

Merchandise and other media 

The series spawned a western-themed clothing line.

Soundtrack 
A Soundtrack album was released to accompany the series on May 17, 2005 by BMG Strategic Marketing Group/BMG Heritage.

Track listing 
 "Take a Walk" – Sara Paxton  
 "I Love Your Smile" – Tiffany Evans  
 "Crazy Kinda Crush on You" – Nick Jonas  
 "Bam Boogie" – Bent Fabric  
 "We Need Some Money" – Chuck Brown & the Soul Searchers  
 "Hey Boy" – Fan 3
 "Walking the Dog" – Rufus Thomas  
 "Monkey Man" – The Specials  
 "ABC" – American Juniors  
 "Walking on Sunshine" – Nikki Cleary  
 "Clothes Make the Girl" – Kristy Frank 
 "There for You" – Sara Paxton

Books 
A tie-in series of books were published, written by various authors including Jory Simms, Laura J. Burns, Daniella Burr & Sierra Harimann.
 Welcome to Where?
 A Chick Thing
 A Fine State of Affairs
 Scout's Honor
 The Play's the Thing
 Go West, Darcy!
 Super Sweet Sixteen
 A Dog's Life

References

External links 
 

2000s American teen sitcoms
2004 American television series debuts
2006 American television series endings
2000s Canadian teen sitcoms
2004 Canadian television series debuts
2006 Canadian television series endings
American educational television series
Canadian educational television series
Discovery Kids original programming
English-language television shows
Family Channel (Canadian TV network) original programming
Television series about teenagers
Television shows filmed in Toronto
Television series by Temple Street Productions